Tizi Ouzou (Kabyle: Tawilayt n Tizi Wezzu) is a province (wilayah) of Algeria in the Kabylia region. Its capital is Tizi Ouzou.

History
In 1984, Boumerdès Province was carved out of its territory.

Administrative divisions
The province is divided into 21 districts (daïras), which are further divided into 67 communes or municipalities.

Districts

 Aïn El Hammam
 Azazga
 Azzefoun
 Béni Douala
 Béni Yenni
 Boghni
 Bouzeguène
 Draâ Ben Khedda
 Draâ El Mizan
 Iferhounène
 Larbaâ Nath Irathen
 Maâtka
 Makouda
 Mekla
 Ouadhia
 Ouacifs
 Ouaguenoun
 Tigzirt
 Tizi Gheni
 Tizi
 Tizi Rached

Communes

 Abi Youcef
 Aghni-Goughrane (Agouni Gueghrane)
 Aghrib
 Aïn El Hammam (Ain-El-Hammam)
 Aïn Zaouia (Ain-Zaouia)
 Ait Aggouacha
 Ait Bouaddou
 Ait Boumehdi (Ait Boumahdi)
 Ait Chaffaa (Ait-Chaffaa, Ait Chafâa)
 Ait Khelili (Ait Khellili)
 Ait Mahmoud (Ait-Mahmoud)
 Ait Oumalou
 Ait Toudert
 Ait Yahia (Ait-Yahia
 Ait Yahia Moussa (Aït Yahia Moussa)
 Akbil
 Akerrou
 Assi Youcef
 Azazga
 Azzefoun (Azeffoun)
 Beni Aissi (Beni Aïssi)
 Beni Douala (Beni-Douala)
 Beni Yenni
 Beni Ziki (Beni Zikki, Beni Zekki)
 Beni Zmenzer
 Boghni
 Boudjima
 Bounouh
 Bouzguen (Bouzeguene)
 Djebel Aissa Mimoun (Djebel-Aissa Mimoun)
 Draa Ben Kheda (Draa Ben Khedda, Draâ Ben Khedda)
 Draa El Mizan (Draâ El Mizan)
 Freha
 Frikat
 Iboudraren
 Idjeur
 Iferhounene (Iferhounène)
 Ifigha
 Iflissen
 Illilten
 Iloula Oumalou (Illoula Oumalou)
 Imsouhal
 Irdjen
 Larba Nait Irathen (Larbaâ Nath Irathen)
 M'Kira
 Maatkas (Mâatkas)
 Makouda
 Mechtrass
 Mekla
 Mizrana
 Ouacifs
 Ouadhia
 Ouaguenoun
 Sidi Nâamane
 Souamaa (Souamâa)
 Souk El Tenine (Souk El Thenine)
 Tadmait (Tadmaït)
 Tigzirt
 Timizart
 Tirmirtine (Tirmitine)
 Tizi Ghenif (Tizi-Ghenif)
 Tizi N'Thlata (Tizi N'Tleta)
 Tizi Ouzou
 Tizi Rached (Tizi-Rached)
 Yakouren (Yakourene)
 Yatafene (Yattafene, Yattafène)
 Zekri

Villages
 Tala Allam
 Tala Athmane

Notable people
 Mohamed Belhocine, Algerian medical scientist, professor of internal medicine and epidemiology.

References

 
Kabylie
Provinces of Algeria
States and territories established in 1974